Novalja is a town in the north of the island of Pag in the Croatian part of Adriatic Sea. In recent times, Novalja has become famous because of the Zrće Beach.

History 
The earliest settlers on the island were an Illyrian tribe that came to the region in the Bronze Age; traces of their settlement can still be seen around Pag. In the 1st century BC, the Romans took possession, and have left numerous archeological and cultural artifacts.

Novalja is the successor of a Roman city called Cissa, considered by many scholars to be the seat of an ancient Christian bishopric of that name. Others prefer to identify the see with an island city of the same name in Istria, close to present-day Rovinj. A bishop of Cissa named Vindemius took part in some year between 571 and 577 in a schismatic synod in Grado called by Patriarch Elias of Aquileia. Arrested by the Exarch of Ravenna he was forced to abjure his views on the controversy of the Three Chapters, but once free from Byzantine Empire control reaffirmed his position and took part in another schismatic synod in 590. A bishop of Cissa called Ursinus took part in a synod at Rome in 680 and signed the acts. Soon after, Cissa ceased to exist, perhaps because of an earthquake. No longer a residential bishopric, Cissa is today listed by the Catholic Church as a titular see.

The Croats arrived in the 7th century along with the great migration and settled in the area. The island was for some time under the rule of the Croatian kingdom. Yet the island was always fought over, and in the 11th and 12th centuries was divided between the communities of Rab and of Zadar. Novalja was given to the community and diocese of Rab by Croatian King Petar Krešimir IV. From the 12th to 14th centuries, Novalja, along with other Dalmatian towns and islands, it was fiercely contested between the Republic of Venice and the Croatian-Hungarian rulers. For four centuries from the start of the 15th century it was held by Venice, until Venice lost its independence. Austria and France then fought over the Dalmatian area with victory going to the Austrians.

The island passed from Austria to the Kingdom of Yugoslavia after World War I, and then to the Independent State of Croatia (1941–1945). After the Second World War it returned to Yugoslavia and, when this broke up, it became part of the new state of Croatia.  Unusually, the island is divided between two counties, with Novalja and Stara Novalja being part of the northern Lika-Senj County.

Population

Villages
 Caska
 Gajac
 Kustići
 Lun
 Metajna
 Novalja
 Potočnica
 Stara Novalja
 Vidalići
 Zubovići

Gallery

References

External links

 

Cities and towns in Croatia
Pag (island)
Populated places in Lika-Senj County
Populated coastal places in Croatia
Cities in ancient Illyria
Illyrian Croatia
Catholic titular sees in Europe
Former Roman Catholic dioceses in Croatia